Jilinicaris is an extinct genus of crustacean in the order Decapoda, and is the earliest fossil assigned to the Stenopodidea, having been found in rocks of Late Cretaceous age.

References

Stenopodidea
Late Cretaceous crustaceans
Late Cretaceous arthropods of Asia
Santonian genera
Fossil taxa described in 2000